The following is a list of awards, honors, and nominations received by American actress, producer, and children's author Jamie Lee Curtis. Among her various competitive accolades, she is the recipient of one Academy Award, one BAFTA Award (from three nominations), two Golden Globe Awards (from eight nominations), and two Screen Actors Guild Awards (from three nominations). She has also been nominated for one Primetime Emmy Award, one Grammy Award, and one Independent Spirit Award.

Among her various honorary accolades, Curtis received a star on the Hollywood Walk of Fame in 1998, the Golden Lion Honorary Award at the 78th Venice International Film Festival in 2021, as well as the AARP Movies for Grownups Career Achievement Award and the Maltin Modern Master Award from the Santa Barbara International Film Festival, both in 2023.

Major industry awards

Academy Awards

BAFTA Awards

Emmy Awards

Golden Globe Awards

Grammy Awards

Independent Spirit Awards

Screen Actors Guild Awards

Critics' awards

Other awards and nominations

Honors

See also
 List of Jamie Lee Curtis performances

References

External links
 

Lists of awards received by American actor